Alfred Davey may refer to:
 Alfred Davey (Australian politician)
 Alfred Davey (New Zealand politician)